A millstone is a stone used in gristmills, for grinding wheat or other grains.

Millstone may also refer to:

Media
 "Millstone", a song on Brand New's 2006 album The Devil and God Are Raging Inside Me
 "Millstone", a song on Eisley's 2013 album Currents
 The Millstone (novel), a novel by Margaret Drabble

Places
 Millstone Nuclear Power Plant, the only nuclear power generation site in Connecticut
 Millstone River, a 38.6-mile-long (62.1 km) tributary of the Raritan River in central New Jersey
 Millstone Township, New Jersey, a township in Monmouth County, New Jersey, United States
 Millstone, Mercer County, New Jersey, an unincorporated community located within East Windsor Township in Mercer County, New Jersey, United States
 Millstone, New Jersey, a borough in Somerset County, New Jersey, United States

Other
 James Millstone (1930–1992), American journalist and editor
 Millstone Coffee, a brand of coffee sold in the US
 Millstone Grit, any of a number of coarse-grained sandstones of Carboniferous age which occur in the British Isles
 Millstone Hill, a fully steerable dish antenna

See also 
 Grindstone, a round sharpening stone used for grinding or sharpening ferrous tools